Kill Kenada is a British rock music group from Bognor Regis, England, formed in 2001 and inspired by Fugazi, Pavement, Sonic Youth, Pixies, Urusei Yatsura, At the Drive-In, and others. The band's name is a reference to the character Shotaro Kaneda (Akira).  The name Kill Kenada was chosen by accident, when lead singer Tim Smithen accidentally misspelled Kaneda, and the incorrect spelling has been maintained.

History
Kill Kenada first success was winning a battle of the bands contest in Portsmouth. They then went on to record some songs with Gordon Raphael, well known for producing the popular indie band The Strokes. Their first release was a limited edition 7" on SUBverse Recordings, a record label set up by the band. The first single release song "Choke", (released on 28 July 2003) received high praise from many media critics.

'Red And Black' was their next single but their first self-produced single with a Gordon Raphael-produced b-side "Hit The Floor"; released on 10 November 2003. Released with the single was a video on formats CD and 7". General and underground success followed. The band reached the top 5 in the MTV2 Chart, received radio airplay (as well as a Radio 1 live session with Zane Lowe). It emerged that Lowe was a huge fan; he ended the session by saying, "I feel very honoured to be involved with the band this early on...."

The band toured in January and February 2004 with local friends, the relatively unknown band Bloc Party and Norwegian band Span.

The band was then invited to play a special MTV2 show - Gonzo On Snow with Million Dead, Jetplane Landing and a few others on 24 March 2004. Their next release, "Massachusetts Murder Medallions" was already receiving airplay on MTV2.

"Massachusetts Murder Medallions" (once again produced by Gordon Raphael) was released on 10 May 2004. The single was made available only on CD format and was also given a promo video. The video received many requests on MTV2, more radio airplay and a small fanbase. To converge with the release, the band went on tour with Ikara Colt, Bloc Party and Yourcodenameis:milo from May - June in 2004. The band also played with Jetplane Landing on 26 May 2004. A live recording of this whole gig exists but only a few people have the Kill Kenada set, with Jetplane Landing's set being used on their 'Courage/Danger' EP release.

After taking a tour break of two months after their June tour to play 93feeteast with Yourcodenameis:milo on 5 August 2004 debuting new songs.

The band then learnt that Steve Albini wanted to work with Kill Kenada, and a date was set to record with him. They made some new songs which were said to be a departure from their 'mental' old style, yet more focussed and aggressive. In August, 2005 then-drummer Stewart Fairhurst (aka 'Stoo') telephoned Tim and Danny to say that he would not be able to make the next practice and the recording session trip in September to Albini's 'Electrical Audio' studio in Chicago.

The band found a new drummer in 'Eldge' who practiced solid for four weeks before he joined the group for the Heathrow flight to Chicago. Eight songs emerged from the 10-day recording period with Steve.

The 10-month absence from public view called for Kill Kenada to revive fan interest. A CD-album of Gordon Raphael tunes was released on 28 September 2005. This was an album of songs that the group felt had long been overdue.

They did their best to make it clear that this release was to hammer the final nail in the coffin for those songs (which could have been released ages ago) and to illustrate this, the release was very modest. The album was a simply pink CD in a pink wallet – no artwork, no lyrics, no track list. Only 500 were made, each individually numbered and only available for purchase from their label's website – SUBverse Recordings and from Rough Trade.

During this time, the band returned to touring (September–November, 2005) during which they were unexpectedly featured on Channel 4 news where it was reported that Kill Kenada was an aggressive art-rock trio from Bognor that independently released their singles through the Shellshock distribution network and their website.

Their next release was not until 27 March 2006; 'Fly', featuring new drummer, Eldge and recorded by Justin Lockey of Yourcodenameis:milo) was a politically charged offering, with both their aggressive and soft, reflective modes both employed to great effect. The music of the single is organised in a timelike state to reflect the thoughts and feelings of anti-American terrorists (most notably those involved in 9/11) and took on-board their perspectives.

The video for the song can be viewed online, and was made by Red Snow Studios who also made a video for the song from the Pink Album, "Sado Maso". The Pink Album had at the time never been seen. Due to the song's lyrics, it was a hard release to promote and the excitement behind promoting the song and single died down.

After touring extensively, Kill Kenada released "In Your Throat" on 7" vinyl format only. The video reaching No. 1 in both the MTV2 NME Chart Show and MTV2's 'The Rock Chart Show'. The single also received radio airplay from many stations, most notably Radio 1's Zane Lowe who affectingly stopped the backing music to introduce the band's return. A live session on BBC6 Music's Tom Robinson show followed where the band performed "In Your Throat", "She's Red" and then premiered their current single at the time "Saline".

On 12 March 2008 a message appeared on their official website:

FROM MAGGOTS 2 FLIES-----> WERE BACK! :)
YO YO YO U MONKEYYYYS!
HHHUH? OK WE BEEN AWAY LADIES AND GENTS BUT SINCE OUR ANTI TANK SLIP SHANK CRIOGENIC STORM SLEEP WE HAVE BEEN WRITING AND RECORDING I PROMISE!!!

ARRGGHHHHH.

NEW SONGS NEW DRUMMER AND NEW BOOTS! BE EXCITED AND READY BABY COS WERE COMING TO GET YA... YR NUMBERS HAVE BEEN FILED AND U WILL BE COUNTED...

THE REVOLUTION SHALL BE TELEVISED... KK AM/FM HIFI HD READY MUTHA FUKKKRS.... WATCH THIS SPACE! NEW SINGLE FLOATING ON LA HORIZON IN THE SUMMER HATRED...

LOVE KK X X X

They also uploaded the new song "Welcome To Hell" on their Myspace page which may be on their upcoming album. Other tracks that may be included in the new album are "From Maggots To Flies" and "ABC". No new album released date has been set although artwork by Dan Baldwin has appeared on the band's official website.

In June 2010, the band released their second album From Maggots to Flies, produced by Kevin Vanbergen via SUBverse Recordings.

Band members
 Tim Smithen, bass and vocals
 Danny Williams, guitar

Former members
 Stewart Fairhurst, drums (2001–2005)
 James Eldrige, drums (2005–2007)

Discography

Albums
The Pink Album (28 September 2005; SUBverse Recordings)
From Maggots To Flies (30 June 2010; SUBverse Recordings)

Singles
 "Choke" (28 July 2003; SUBverse Recordings)
 "Red And Black" (10 November 2003; SUBverse Recordings)
 "Massachusetts Murder Medallions" (10 May 2004; SUBverse Recordings)
 "Fly" (27 March 2006; SUBverse Recordings)
 "In Your Throat" (SUBverse Recordings)
 "Saline" (25 June 2007; SUBverse Recordings)

Other appearances
Kill Kenada feature on Regina Spektor's song "Your Honor" which was released as a single and on the album, Soviet Kitsch.

References

External links
 Official Kill Kenada website
 Kill Kenada MySpace
 SUBverse Recordings

People from Bognor Regis
British post-hardcore musical groups